Kiltuish River is a river in the Canadian province of British Columbia. The Kiltuish River is within the traditional territory of the Haisla people.

The name "Kiltuish" comes from a Haisla word meaning "long and narrow stretch of water leading outward".

Course
The Kiltuish River originates in the Kitimat Ranges west of the Kowesas River and just north of the source of the Khutze River. It flows generally north and northwest, emptying into Kiltuish Inlet, an arm of Gardner Canal between the Alan and Europa Reaches. The Gardner Canal joins the Pacific Ocean via Devastation Passage, Verney Passage, Douglas Channel, and the complex waterways around Gil Island, Campania Island, and the Estevan Group, which exit into Caamaño Sound and Hecate Strait.

See also
 List of British Columbia rivers

References

Rivers of British Columbia
Rivers of the Kitimat Ranges
Rivers of the North Coast of British Columbia